The Fireman may refer to:

The Fireman (band)
The Fireman (1916 film), a film by Charlie Chaplin
The Fireman (1931 film), a short animated film
"The Fireman" (song), a song recorded by George Strait
The Fireman, the title of the book Fahrenheit 451, as first published
The Fireman, 1989 novel by Stephen Leather
The Fireman (novel), a novel by Joe Hill
The Giant (Twin Peaks), a character in the television series Twin Peaks who later identifies himself as The Fireman.

See also 
Fireman (disambiguation)